Fritz Laband (1 November 1925 – 3 January 1982) was a German footballer who played as a defender.

He was part of the West Germany national team that won the 1954 FIFA World Cup. In total he earned four caps for West Germany. During his club career he played for FC Anker Wismar, Hamburger SV and Werder Bremen.

His standard position being that of a right full back, Laband was a thorough-going and powerful player with good long range passing ability. With his international debut coming less than two months before the 1954 FIFA World Cup, he managed to play in three of Germany's six games at that tournament. For the semi final and the final, coach Sepp Herberger however decided to move his Hamburg club teammate Josef Posipal to the right back position.

References

1925 births
1982 deaths
Sportspeople from Zabrze
People from the Province of Upper Silesia
German footballers
East German footballers
Association football defenders
Germany international footballers
FC Anker Wismar players
Hamburger SV players
SV Werder Bremen players
1954 FIFA World Cup players
FIFA World Cup-winning players